George Shelby Smith (October 27, 1901 – May 26, 1981) was a middle relief pitcher in Major League Baseball who played from  through  for the Detroit Tigers (1926–1929) and Boston Red Sox (1930). He was born in Louisville, Kentucky.
 
In a four-season career, Smith posted 10–8 record with a 5.28 ERA in 132 appearances, including seven starts, one complete game, saves, 135 strikeouts, and  innings of work.

He gave up one of Babe Ruth's record-setting 60 home runs during the 1927 New York Yankees season.

Smith died at the age of 79 in Richmond, Virginia.

External links
Baseball Reference
Retrosheet

Detroit Tigers players
Boston Red Sox players
Major League Baseball pitchers
Baseball players from Louisville, Kentucky
1901 births
1981 deaths